Electoral results for the Division of Corinella  may refer to:

 Electoral results for the Division of Corinella (1901–06)
 Electoral results for the Division of Corinella (1990–96)